Yang Song-guk (Hangul: 양성국; born 19 August 1944) is a North Korean football forward who played for North Korea in the 1966 FIFA World Cup. There he scored against Portugal in the Quarter-finals at Goodison Park. He also played for Kigwancha Pyongyang. He also competed in the men's tournament at the 1976 Summer Olympics.

References

1944 births
North Korean footballers
North Korea international footballers
Association football forwards
1966 FIFA World Cup players
Living people
Olympic footballers of North Korea
Footballers at the 1976 Summer Olympics
Place of birth missing (living people)
Footballers at the 1974 Asian Games
Asian Games competitors for North Korea